This article is about the administrative divisions of the Republic of North Macedonia. North Macedonia is currently divided into 80 municipalities.

Socialist Republic of Macedonia
As the Socialist Republic of Macedonia, a constituent country of the former Socialist Federal Republic of Yugoslavia, North Macedonia was first divided into regions in 1945. Later, the regions were abolished, and North Macedonia was divided into municipalities. Before its independence, North Macedonia was divided into 34 municipalities.

Republic of North Macedonia
After its independence, from 1996 to 2004, the then Republic of Macedonia was divided into 123 municipalities.

See also

ISO 3166-2 codes of North Macedonia
FIPS region codes of North Macedonia (standard withdrawn in 2008)
NUTS of North Macedonia

References 

 
North Macedonia